The BJP is the Bharatiya Janata Party, India's ruling political party.

BJP may also refer to:
 Bangladesh Jatiya Party, a Bangladeshi political party
 Bence Jones protein, a biomolecule
 Bharatiya Janata Party: Past, Present and Future, a 2019 book by Shantanu Gupta
 Tangga language (ISO 639 code: bjp), spoken in Papua New Guinea
BJP!, a slogan of MMA fighter Jiří Procházka